Gergely Ivanics (born 8 April 1978) is a Hungarian former road cyclist.

Major results

2006
 2nd Road race, National Road Championships
 6th Overall Grand Prix Cycliste de Gemenc
2007
 3rd Banja Luka–Belgrade I
 4th Overall Grand Prix Cycliste de Gemenc
 6th GP Betonexpressz 2000
2008
 1st Grand Prix P-Nívó
 2nd Overall Tour of Szeklerland
 3rd Road race, National Road Championships
 4th Trofeo Città di Brescia
 5th Banja Luka–Belgrade I
 10th Tour of Vojvodina I
 10th Banja Luka–Belgrade II
2009
 1st GP Betonexpressz 2000
 3rd Time trial, National Road Championships
 5th Overall Romanian Cycling Tour
 6th Banja Luka–Belgrade
 10th GP Kooperativa
2010
 1st Overall Grand Prix Cycliste de Gemenc
1st Stages 1, 2 & 3
 2nd GP Betonexpressz 2000
2011
 8th GP Betonexpressz 2000

References

External links

1978 births
Living people
Hungarian male cyclists
Sportspeople from Pécs